Jerry I. Speyer (born June 23, 1940) is an American real estate developer. He is one of two founding partners of the New York real estate company Tishman Speyer, which controls the Rockefeller Center.

Early life and education
Speyer was born in Milwaukee, Wisconsin, the son of Germaine M. and Ernest A. Speyer. According to a 1998 profile in The New York Times, "[Speyer's] mother is Swiss, and his father comes from one of the old Jewish families of Frankfurt" (however, there is only very distant connection to the Speyer banking family, if any); his father, a shoe manufacturer, fled Germany in 1939, established a business in Milwaukee, before moving to New York when Jerry was three months old. Speyer grew up in a cultured German-Jewish household on Riverside Drive. He graduated from the private Horace Mann School. At Columbia University, he majored in German literature and joined Zeta Beta Tau, a Jewish fraternity. He was a friend of Art Garfunkel and Sanford Greenberg, his roommates, and Michael Mukasey. "Speyer was one of those people who were solid, and even solemn, at an age when others are still flailing and unsure of themselves." Speyer graduated from Columbia College in 1962 and received an MBA from Columbia Business School in 1964.

Career
Speyer began his career in 1964 as Assistant to the Vice President of Madison Square Garden. Speyer has served as President & CEO of Tishman Speyer since he formed the company together with his father-in-law Robert Tishman in 1978.

Speyer has served as chairman of the Federal Reserve Bank of New York, chairman of the Museum of Modern Art, and vice chair on the Board of Trustees of the Rand Corporation. Speyer is also chair of the Executive Committee and chairman emeritus of Columbia University, chair emeritus of the Real Estate Board of New York, and past president of the Board of Trustees of the Dalton School.

Speyer sits on the board of Carnegie Hall, alongside Sanford Weill, the former chairman of Citigroup, with whom he has a close business relationship (see External Links below). His other board affiliations include Siemens AG and the Real Estate Roundtable, and have included Yankee Global Enterprises, and the Urban Land Institute.  He is a member of the Economic Club of New York and the Council on Foreign Relations.

Speyer is also chair emeritus of the Partnership for New York City, founded by David Rockefeller.

Speyer has sat on the Board of Trustees of NewYork–Presbyterian Hospital since 2000 and has served as President of the Board since 2019, including during the COVID-19 crisis.

Personal life
In 1964, Speyer married Lynn Tishman, whose great-grandfather Julius Tishman founded Tishman Realty and Construction, of which Tishman Speyer is a spinoff. In 1987, they divorced (Lynn later married Harold R. Handler, who is retired as a senior partner in the New York law firm of Simpson Thacher & Bartlett). They had three children:
Valerie Hope Speyer Peltier (born 1967) works at Tishman Speyer as part of the Acquisitions and Development group. In 1993, she married Jeffrey Richard Peltier of Tipp City, Ohio. The wedding was officiated by Rabbi Peter Rubinstein at the Rainbow Room in New York.
Rob Speyer (born 1969) previously worked as a reporter at The New York Daily News but is now is a chief executive and the president of Tishman Speyer. In 2008, he married Anne-Cecilie Engell (who is Danish) in a nondenominational ceremony in Copenhagen.
Holly Ann Speyer Lipton (born 1973) works as a television producer. In 1999, she married Jonathan Lipton. The wedding was officiated by Rabbi Peter Rubinstein at the Pierre in New York.

In 1991, Speyer married Katherine G. Farley, whom he had hired in 1984 to oversee international development. They have a daughter, Laura Speyer (born 1992). Farley graduated from Brown University in 1971, and with a Masters of Architecture from the Harvard Graduate School of Design in 1976. She served as manager of new business development for East Asia and the Pacific for Turner International Industries before joining Tishman Speyer in 1984. She is a senior managing director at the Tishman Speyer, responsible for the company's real estate activities in Latin America and for the company's expansion into other emerging markets, chairs the company's Compensation Committee, and is a member of the Management, Investment, and Executive Committees. She is chair of Lincoln Center's redevelopment and is on the executive committee of the International Rescue Committee, a refugee relief and resettlement organization, and is chair emeritus of Women in Need, which helps homeless women and children in New York City. She is a vice president of the Brearley School, and a member of the Board and Executive Committee of the Alvin Ailey Dance Foundation. Farley has served on the boards of Lincoln Center Theater and the New York Philharmonic.

Recognition
Golden Plate Award of the American Academy of Achievement, 1997
American Academy of Arts & Sciences, 2014
Crain’s New York Hall of Fame, 2020

References

External links
 Tishman Speyer website
 Megadeal: Inside a Real Estate Coup, New York Times, December 31, 2006 Profiles Tishman Speyer and Jerry and Rob Speyer and the purchase of Stuyvesant Town and Peter Cooper Village in Manhattan.
 New York's Cultural Power Brokers New York Times article on Jerry Speyer of Tishman Speyer Properties and his many connections to Sanford Weill of Citigroup, as well as to David Rockefeller through the Museum of Modern Art and Rockefeller Center.

1940 births
Living people
American art collectors
American chief executives
American people of German-Jewish descent
American real estate businesspeople
Jewish American art collectors
Columbia Business School alumni
Columbia College (New York) alumni
Horace Mann School alumni
Rockefeller Center
American billionaires
Tishman family